Coletti is an Italian surname. Notable people with the surname include:

 Alex Coletti, executive producer and director for MTV Networks
 Alexandra Coletti (born 1983), Italian-born alpine skier for Monaco
 Antonio Magini-Coletti (1855–1912), Italian operatic baritone
 Edward "Ed" Coletti, American poet
 Giovanni Giacomo Coleti or Coletti (1734–1827), Italian historian and philologist
 Giambattista Coletti (born 1948), Italian, Olympic silver medal in fencing at Montreal 1976
 Jean Coletti, French name for Ioannis Kolettis (died 1847), Prime Minister of Greece
 John Coletti (born 1949), American automobile engineer
 Joseph Coletti (1896-1973)  American sculptor
 Mattia Coletti (born 1984), Italian ski mountaineer
 Nicola Coleti or Coletti (1680–1765), Italian Catholic priest and historian
 Paul Coletti (born 1959), Scottish viola soloist and chamber musician
 Stephen Colletti (born 1986), Italian-American actor and television personality

Fictional characters
 Rick Coletti, a character on the American television series Desperate Housewives

Italian-language surnames
Patronymic surnames
Surnames from given names